Albert James Ferrari Jr. (born July 24, 2001, in Allen, Texas) is an American freestyle and folkstyle wrestler who competes internationally at 92 kilograms and collegiately at 197 pounds. In freestyle, he claimed a bronze medal from the 2018 Cadet World Championships and was the 2020 US Junior National Champion. In folkstyle, Ferrari is a Former NCAA Division I National Champion and Big 12 Conference champion out of the Oklahoma State University, and was the top-ranked high school wrestler at the time of his commitment. Ferrari left the OSU wrestling team after local police announced he was under investigation for sexual assault. On August 3, 2022 Ferrari was charged with felony sexual battery.

Amateur wrestling career

High school 
Born and raised in Texas, Ferrari first attended Allen High School, where he became a two-time state champion and claimed a Walsh Jesuit Ironman title, as well as a Cadet Fargo National Championship in freestyle wrestling. In 2018, Ferrari claimed a Cadet World Championship bronze medal before he and his family moved to New Jersey, where he attended Blair Academy as the top-ranked 195 pounder in the country. While in Blair, he claimed a Beast of the East title by beating the second-ranked wrestler in the nation Jacob Cardenas (helping to the team title) and another Ironman title (also helping to the team title). He then transferred to Bergen Catholic High School, where he was also dominant but not eligible to compete in the post-season, like in Blair. After that, he moved back to Allen, Texas, where his senior year was derailed by an ankle injury. In 2020, Ferrari claimed the US Junior National Championship in freestyle.

College 
In October 2019, Ferrari, the top-recruit in the country, committed to the Oklahoma State University, over others like Rutgers, Penn State, Nebraska and Ohio State.

2020–2021 
During regular season, Ferrari compiled a 12–1 record, with his only loss being handed to him by the highly-ranked Noah Adams from West Virginia. Entering the post-season, Ferrari ran through the bracket to claim his first Big 12 Conference title, becoming the first true freshman to be named the Most Outstanding Wrestler of the tournament since 2005. At the NCAAs, Ferrari, the fourth seed, clinched three matches to make the semifinals, notably defeating All-American Jacob Warner from Iowa and highly–ranked Tanner Sloan, before facing the Olympian and B1G Champion Myles Amine. Ferrari was able to prove himself by soundly defeating the highly skilled three-time All-American on points to advance to the finals, taking out the top–seed. In the finale, he defeated Nino Bonaccorsi from Pittsburgh, becoming an NCAA champion as a true freshman, the third in the Cowboys' history. 

In April, Ferrari bumped up 17 pounds to make his senior freestyle debut at age 19, at the rescheduled US Olympic Team Trials in April 1–3 as the sixth seed at 97 kilograms, in an attempt to represent the United States at the 2020 Summer Olympics. In the first round, he was defeated by 2018 NCAA champion Michael Macchiavello, and lost controversially to 2019 graduate Ben Honis in the consolation bracket.

2021–2022 
With an undefeated 10–0 record midway through the season, Ferrari and Oklahoma State cross country runner Isai Rodriguez were involved in a serious car accident where Ferrari's car was completely destroyed. 
Ferrari was airlifted to OU Health in Oklahoma City for treatment for internal bleeding and fluid on his lungs.
Ferrari withdrew from the rest of the season since his injuries required surgery.

Criminal charges
On July 5, 2022, a woman filed for an emergency protective order against Ferrari, alleging he sexually assaulted her on July 2 in her home. On July 14, Oklahoma State University confirmed Ferrari had left their wrestling team. An hour later, the Stillwater Police Department announced Ferrari was under investigation for sexual assault. On August 3, 2022 Ferrari was charged with felony sexual battery in Payne County District Court. After the charges were announced Ferrari's attorney released a statement saying “we remain confident that through the legal process, A.J. Jr. will be exonerated, as he is innocent and the facts will no doubt prove it.”

Personal life
Ferrari is from Allen, Texas, and he started wrestling after the family's move to Dallas. Ferrari and his family are devout Christians and proud Italian Americans.

Ferrari is preparing for a transition to Mixed Martial Arts and has been training in various striking martial arts, and Brazilian jiu-jitsu alongside Rodolfo Vieira.

Freestyle record 

! colspan="7"| Senior Freestyle Matches
|-
!  Res.
!  Record
!  Opponent
!  Score
!  Date
!  Event
!  Location
|-
! style=background:white colspan=7 |
|-
|Loss
|0–2
|align=left| Ben Honis
|style="font-size:88%"|10–11
|style="font-size:88%" rowspan=2|April 2–3, 2021
|style="font-size:88%" rowspan=2|2020 US Olympic Team Trials
|style="text-align:left;font-size:88%;" rowspan=2| Fort Worth, Texas
|-
|Loss
|0–1
|align=left| Mike Macchiavello
|style="font-size:88%"|1–3
|-

NCAA record 

! colspan="8"| NCAA Division I Record
|-
!  Res.
!  Record
!  Opponent
!  Score
!  Date
!  Event
|-
! style=background:lighgrey colspan=6 |Start of 2022–2023 Season (junior year)
|-
! style=background:lighgrey colspan=6 |End of 2021–2022 Season (sophomore year)
|-
|Win
|30–1
|align=left| TJ Davis
|style="font-size:88%"|MD 12–2
|style="font-size:88%"|January 23, 2022
|style="font-size:88%"|Lehigh - Oklahoma State Dual
|-
|Win
|29–1
|align=left| Sam Wustefeld
|style="font-size:88%"|Fall
|style="font-size:88%"|January 16, 2022
|style="font-size:88%"|Columbia - Oklahoma State Dual
|-
|Win
|28–1
|align=left| Brooks Sacharczyk
|style="font-size:88%"|Fall
|style="font-size:88%"|January 8, 2022
|style="font-size:88%"|Oklahoma State - Little Rock Dual
|-
|Win
|27–1
|align=left| Evan Bockman
|style="font-size:88%"|6–3
|style="font-size:88%"|December 20, 2021
|style="font-size:88%"|Oklahoma State - Utah Valley Dual
|-
|Win
|26–1
|align=left| Stephen Buchanan
|style="font-size:88%"|4–2
|style="font-size:88%"rowspan=2|December 17, 2021
|style="font-size:88%"|Oklahoma State - Wyoming Dual
|-
|Win
|25–1
|align=left| Kayne Hutchison
|style="font-size:88%"|TF 19–4
|style="font-size:88%"|Oklahoma State - Air Force Dual
|-
|Win
|24–1
|align=left| Jake Woodley
|style="font-size:88%"|6–3
|style="font-size:88%"|December 12, 2021
|style="font-size:88%"|Oklahoma State - Oklahoma Dual
|-
|Win
|23–1
|align=left| Santino Morina
|style="font-size:88%"|TF 17–2
|style="font-size:88%"|November 28, 2021
|style="font-size:88%"|Drexel - Oklahoma State Dual	
|-
|Win
|22–1
|align=left| Michial Foy
|style="font-size:88%"|MD 12–4
|style="font-size:88%"|November 20, 2021
|style="font-size:88%"|Oklahoma State - Minnesota Dual	
|-
|Win
|21–1
|align=left| Nick Stemmet
|style="font-size:88%"|MD 16–3
|style="font-size:88%"|November 13, 2021
|style="font-size:88%"|Stanford - Oklahoma State Dual
|-
! style=background:lighgrey colspan=6 |Start of 2021–2022 Season (sophomore year)
|-
! style=background:lighgrey colspan=6 |End of 2020–2021 Season (freshman year)
|-
! style=background:white colspan=6 |2021 NCAA Championships  at 197 lbs
|-
|Win
|20–1
|align=left| Nino Bonaccorsi
|style="font-size:88%"|4–2
|style="font-size:88%" rowspan=5|March 18–20, 2021
|style="font-size:88%" rowspan=5|2021 NCAA Division I Wrestling Championships
|-
|Win
|19–1
|align=left| Myles Amine
|style="font-size:88%"|5–1
|-
|Win
|18–1
|align=left| Jacob Warner
|style="font-size:88%"|3–2
|-
|Win
|17–1
|align=left| Tanner Sloan
|style="font-size:88%"|5–0
|-
|Win
|16–1
|align=left| Colin Mccracken
|style="font-size:88%"|TF 18–2
|-
! style=background:white colspan=6 |2021 Big 12 Conference  at 197 lbs
|-
|Win
|15–1
|align=left| Stephen Buchanan
|style="font-size:88%"|6–1
|style="font-size:88%" rowspan=3|March 6–7, 2021
|style="font-size:88%" rowspan=3|2021 Big 12 Conference Championships
|-
|Win
|14–1
|align=left| Tanner Sloan
|style="font-size:88%"|7–1
|-
|Win
|13–1
|align=left| Jake Woodley
|style="font-size:88%"|8–4
|-
|Win
|12–1
|align=left|Jake Woodley
|style="font-size:88%"|4–1
|style="font-size:88%"|February 21, 2021
|style="font-size:88%"|Oklahoma - Oklahoma State Dual
|-
! style=background:white colspan=6 |2021 Cowboy Challenge Tournament  at 197 lbs
|-
|Win
|11–1
|align=left| Luke Surber 
|style="font-size:88%"|MFOR
|style="font-size:88%" rowspan=3|February 14, 2021
|style="font-size:88%" rowspan=3|2021 Cowboy Challenge Tournament
|-
|Loss
|10–1
|align=left| Noah Adams 
|style="font-size:88%"|2–3
|-
|Win
|10–0
|align=left|Jace Punke
|style="font-size:88%"|TF 17–1
|-
|Win
|9–0
|align=left|Dylan Johnson
|style="font-size:88%"|Fall
|style="font-size:88%" rowspan=2|February 7, 2021
|style="font-size:88%"|Little Rock - Oklahoma State Dual
|-
|Win
|8–0
|align=left|Jake Woodley
|style="font-size:88%"|3–2
|style="font-size:88%"|Oklahoma - Oklahoma State Dual	
|-
|Win
|7–0
|align=left|Yonger Bastida
|style="font-size:88%"|5–2
|style="font-size:88%" rowspan=2|January 30, 2021
|style="font-size:88%"|Oklahoma State - Iowa State Dual
|-
|Win
|6–0
|align=left|Kegan Moore
|style="font-size:88%"|10–4
|style="font-size:88%"|Oklahoma State - Northern Iowa Dual	
|-
|Win
|5–0
|align=left|Kayne Hutchison
|style="font-size:88%"|TF 20–5
|style="font-size:88%"|January 22, 2021
|style="font-size:88%"|Oklahoma State - Air Force Dual
|-
|Win
|4–0
|align=left|Dylan Johnson
|style="font-size:88%"|TF 22–7
|style="font-size:88%" rowspan=2|January 17, 2021
|style="font-size:88%"|Oklahoma State - Little Rock Dual
|-
|Win
|3–0
|align=left|Austin Andres
|style="font-size:88%"|TF 18–2
|style="font-size:88%"|Oklahoma State - Southern Illinois Edwardsville Dual	
|-
|Win
|2–0
|align=left|JJ Dixon
|style="font-size:88%"|MD 16–3
|style="font-size:88%" rowspan=2|January 10, 2021
|style="font-size:88%"|Oregon State - Oklahoma State Dual
|-
|Win
|1–0
|align=left|Logan Andrew
|style="font-size:88%"|MD 16–5
|style="font-size:88%"|Chattanooga - Oklahoma State Dual
|-
! style=background:lighgrey colspan=6 |Start of 2020–2021 Season (freshman year)

Stats 

!  Season
!  Year
!  School
!  Rank
!  Weigh Class
!  Record
!  Win
!  Bonus
|-
|2022
|Sophomore
|rowspan=2|Oklahoma State Cowboys
|#1 (DNC)
|rowspan=2|197
|10–0
|100.00%
|70.00%
|-
|2021
|Freshman
|#4 (1st)
|20–1
|95.24%
|38.10%
|-
|colspan=5 bgcolor="LIGHTGREY"|Career
|bgcolor="LIGHTGREY"|30–1
|bgcolor="LIGHTGREY"|96.77%
|bgcolor="LIGHTGREY"|48.39%

References 

Living people
2001 births
American male sport wrestlers
Oklahoma State Cowboys wrestlers
Sportspeople from Dallas
Amateur wrestlers
Oklahoma State University alumni